The Ministry for Veterans Affairs is a government ministry in Ukraine.

The ministry was officially established on 22 November 2018. Between August 2019 and March 2020, the ministry was temporarily merged with the Ministry of Temporarily Occupied Territories and IDPs.

History
On 27 February 2018 the Ukrainian Parliament adopted an appeal to the Cabinet of Ministers of Ukraine to create an Ministry for Veterans' Affairs "to ensure the formation and implementation of state policy in the field of social protection of war veterans." The appeal proposed to the Government to establish a Ministry for Veterans' Affairs on the basis of the State Service for War Veterans and Participants of the Anti-Terrorist Operation.

The Ministry's first minister was Iryna Friz, who was appointed (also) on 22 November 2018. On the day of her appointment Friz expected the ministry to be fully functional in June 2019.

On 29 August 2019 the Honcharuk Government merged the ministry with the Ministry of Temporarily Occupied Territories and IDPs. During the time of merging the agency existed as the State Service of Ukraine on Veterans Affairs that exists since 2014. On 4 March 2020 the new Shmyhal Government undid the merge of the two ministries.

List of ministers

See also
 Military of Ukraine
 Annexation of Crimea by the Russian Federation
 War in Donbas
 Russo-Ukrainian War
 Humanitarian situation during the war in Donbas

References

Lists of government ministers of Ukraine
Government ministries of Ukraine
Ukraine, Veterans Affairs
Ukraine
2018 establishments in Ukraine
Ukraine
Veterans' affairs in Ukraine
2019 disestablishments in Ukraine
Former government ministries of Ukraine
Ministries disestablished in 2019
2020 establishments in Ukraine
Ukraine, Veterans